In enzymology, an isopenicillin N N-acyltransferase is an enzyme that catalyzes the chemical reaction

phenylacetyl-CoA + isopenicillin N + H2O  CoA + penicillin G + L-2-aminohexanedioate

The 3 substrates of this enzyme are phenylacetyl-CoA, isopenicillin N, and H2O, whereas its 3 products are CoA, penicillin G, and L-2-aminohexanedioate.

This enzyme belongs to the family of transferases, specifically those acyltransferases transferring groups other than aminoacyl groups.  The systematic name of this enzyme class is acyl-CoA:isopenicillin N N-acyltransferase. Other names in common use include acyl-coenzyme A:isopenicillin N acyltransferase, and isopenicillin N:acyl-CoA: acyltransferase.  This enzyme participates in hydrophobic penicillins biosynthesis.

References

Further reading

EC 2.3.1
Enzymes of unknown structure